Cyartonema elegans is a species of free-living marine nematode in the genus Cyartonema found in Scotland.

References

External links 

 
 WoRMS

Chromadorea
Nematodes described in 1977
Invertebrates of Europe